The Lady's from Kentucky is a 1939 film directed by Alexander Hall and starring George Raft and Ellen Drew. It was written by Malcolm Stuart Boylan from a story by Rowland Brown. The screenplay involves a failing bookie (Raft) who becomes half owner of a racehorse, with a Kentucky lady (Drew) owning the other half. ZaSu Pitts plays a supporting role.

Plot
A gambler, Marty Black, wins a fifty percent interest in a thoroughbred owned by Penelope "Penny" Hollis, a prim and proper Kentucky horsewoman. Marty can't wait to wager on his new possession, Roman Son, but the health of the horse is foremost to Penny, who would rather nurture it than race it.

After he enters Roman Son in a race without her knowledge, Marty sees the horse's condition deteriorate. Penny permits him to run Roman Son in the Kentucky Derby and a romance develops after the horse's victory, particularly when Marty agrees to retire Roman Son rather than race any more.

Cast
George Raft as Marty Black
Ellen Drew as Penny Hollis
Hugh Herbert as Mousey Johnson
ZaSu Pitts as Dulcey Lee
Louise Beavers as Aunt Tina
Lew Payton as Sixty
Forrester Harvey as Nonny Watkins
Edward Pawley as Spike Cronin
Gilbert Emery as Pinckney Rodell
Jimmy Bristow as Brewster
Stanley Andrews as Doctor
George Anderson as Joe Lane

Production
The film was originally known as Racing Form. It always seems to have been a vehicle for Raft; Frances Dee was the first female star announced then Shirley Ross. Then Frances Lee was announced as star and Raoul Walsh director.

Raft was suspended by Paramount for refusing to make St Louis Blues He rejoined the studio on 5 October 1938. Walsh was replaced by Alexander Hall and Dee/Ross was replaced by Ellen Drew.

The film was shot partly on location at Oceanside near San Diego. A real foal was born during the making of the film.

The film was the last George Raft made under his contract with Paramount Pictures. Filming ended in January 1939 and Raft left the studio that money after he refused to make The Magnificent Fraud.

After filming the title was briefly changed to The Gambler and the Lady but it soon reverted to The Lady's from Kentucky.

Reception
The New York Times said film "affirms the old Hollywood faith in good breeding, two-legged and four, by demonstrating once again that the New York gambler turned loose to graze in the Bluegrass inevitably comes a spiritual cropper and awakens a new and better man" conceding that "the picture moves briskly enough".

The Los Angeles Times called the film "enjoyable.".

References

External links

The Lady's from Kentucky at TCMDB
Review of film at Variety

1939 films
1939 drama films
Films directed by Alexander Hall
Paramount Pictures films
American drama films
American black-and-white films
1930s English-language films
1930s American films